NGC 998 is a spiral galaxy in the constellation Cetus. It is estimated to be 294 million light years from the Milky Way and has a diameter of approximately 90,000 ly. Together with NGC 997, it forms a gravitationally bound pair of galaxies. NGC 998 was discovered by astronomer Albert Marth on 10 November 1863 using a 48-inch telescope.

See also 
 List of NGC objects (1–1000)

References

External links
 

Cetus (constellation)
0998
Spiral galaxies
009934